A contractum trinius was a set of contracts devised by European bankers and merchants in the Middle Ages as a method of circumventing canonical laws prohibiting usury as a part of Christian finance. At the time, most Christian nations heavily incorporated scripture into their laws, and as such it was illegal for any person to charge interest on a loan of money.

To get around this, a set of three separate contracts were presented to someone seeking a loan: an investment, a sale of profit and an insurance contract. Each of these contracts were permissible under canon law, but together replicated the effect of an interest-bearing loan.

The way this procedure worked was as follows: The lender would invest a sum equal to the amount of financing required by the borrower for one year. The lender would then purchase insurance for the investment from the borrower, and finally sell to the borrower the right to any profit made over a pre-arranged percentage of the investment. This system replicated the effects of a loan with any interest rate agreed between the two, yet provided protection to the lender against default, while the borrower remained under the protection of the law when it came to collection of the money by threats or force (loan sharking).

The Church proved utterly unable to legislate against the contractum trinius, and the idea quickly spread to merchants and bankers across Christendom. It was accepted by writers such as Gabriel Biel; it helped in part to improve public perception of the practice of usury by moneylenders, and ultimately the doctrine was rewritten by the School of Salamanca, and the ban on interest-bearing loans overturned in many Protestant countries, starting with England by Henry VIII.

Some Muslims are of the view that the present practice of Islamic banking relies on devices similar to the contractum trinius as a means of working around a ban of riba (usury) in religious scripture.

See also
Christian finance
Discretionary deposit
Round-tripping (finance)
Substance over form
Islamic finance

External links
An essay comparing Islamic banking practices to the contractum trinius

Banking terms
Credit
Interest
Canon law history